Hoplandriini is a tribe of rove beetles in the family Staphylinidae. There are at least 5 genera and 20 described species in Hoplandriini.

Genera
These five genera belong to the tribe Hoplandriini:
 Hoplandria Kraatz, 1857 i c g b
 Microlia Casey, 1910 i c g b
 Platandria Casey, 1893 i c g b
 Pseudoplandria Fenyes, 1921 c g
 Tetrallus Bernhauer, 1905 i c g
Data sources: i = ITIS, c = Catalogue of Life, g = GBIF, b = Bugguide.net

References

Further reading

External links

 

Aleocharinae